Write the Future is an advert made by Nike football for the 2010 World Cup and directed by Mexican filmmaker Alejandro González Iñárritu for the UK based production company, Independent Films Limited. The full version is over three minutes in length and features football players Didier Drogba, Fabio Cannavaro, Wayne Rooney, Franck Ribéry, Ronaldinho, and Cristiano Ronaldo as its main players. All of the players play in a scenario during a World Cup match and after significant events occur, the players usually see a significant ripple effect outside the world of football. The advert aired during the 2010 FIFA World Cup. It features the song "Hocus Pocus", by progressive rock band Focus. It was created by Wieden+Kennedy and written by Mark Bernath, Eric Quennoy, Stuart Harkness and Freddie Powell. The Sound design and mix was done by Raja Sehgal working out of Grand Central Recording Studios in London. The advertisement won the Film Grand Prix at the 2011 Cannes Lions festival.

Plot 
Didier Drogba is seen making a run towards goal against Italy, with Fabio Cannavaro in hot pursuit. As Drogba moves and shoots for goal, the scene shifts to broadcasters both at the stadium and in studios across Africa, beaming his efforts back to Cote d'Ivoire, where a massive street party is erupting ahead of his assumed goal. However, Cannavaro makes an impressive goal-line clearance: cut to him being the guest of honor on a Mediaset-style Italian variety program, where dancers wearing sequined variations of his #6 shirt re-enact the clearance while suspended on wires, while crooner Bobby Solo sings a song with the lyrics "Che Cannavaro! Che capitano!" 

The ball then comes to Wayne Rooney, who (with time running out) is looking to make a move versus France, attempting to pick out Theo Walcott with a pass while thousands of English fans, both in the ground and watching at home, urge him forward. Rooney makes the pass: however, it is intercepted by Franck Ribéry, and the resulting reaction from the British public is shown: riots in the streets, a plunge in the stock market, young fans tearing down posters of Rooney from their bedroom walls, a tabloid headline reading "ENGLAND IN ROO-INS!" (read, with approval, by Tim Howard and Landon Donovan), and Rooney's eventual plunge into obscurity, bearded and overweight, working as a groundsman at a small football club and living in a caravan underneath a billboard of Ribéry (mimicking a previous ad for Nike, seen earlier in the commercial, where Rooney was painted to look like the St George's Cross). Having seen his "future", we cut back to present-day Rooney, sprinting after Ribéry and making a clean tackle. As the crowd chants his name, the reactions to this are shown: he is knighted, a tabloid shows his face carved into the Cliffs of Dover with the headline "JUST ROO IT!" (read and thrown away by Andrés Iniesta, Gerard Piqué and Cesc Fàbregas), the stock market reaches record highs, scores of babies are named "Wayne", and he even beats Roger Federer in a game of table tennis.

The ball then comes to Brazilian defender Thiago Silva, who springs Ronaldinho into the corner. Faced by a defender, he then executes a number of step-overs, which become a viral video re-enacted and shared millions of times: the step-over even becomes a basis of an exercise video called "RON'S SAMBA-ROBICS" and Kobe Bryant celebrates a late 3-point basket by doing the step-over.

Ronaldinho's eventual cross is chested down by Cristiano Ronaldo, who sprints upfield with the ball past Holland. We are shown scenes of Ronaldo's celebrity: him cutting the ribbon on the "Estádio Cristiano Ronaldo", a cameo on The Simpsons where he appears on the doorstep of 742 Evergreen Terrace and nutmegs Homer Simpson (who reacts with a characteristic "Ronal-D'OH!"), the premiere of Ronaldo: The Movie starring Gael García Bernal as Ronaldo...until he is grabbed and taken down by a Dutch defender. As he sets up the free-kick, scenes of Ronaldo preparing to strike the ball are intercut with his potential "future": the unveiling of a giant statue of Ronaldo in a Portuguese square.

Notable stars 
Notable people seen in the advert, in order of appearance:

 Didier Drogba
 Fabio Cannavaro
 Bobby Solo
 Wayne Rooney
 Lassana Diarra
 Theo Walcott
 Patrice Evra
 Franck Ribéry
 Tim Howard
 Landon Donovan
 Jérémy Toulalan
 Cesc Fàbregas
 Andrés Iniesta
 Gerard Piqué
 Roger Federer
 Thiago Silva
 Luís Fabiano
 Ronaldinho
 Alejandro González Iñárritu
 Kobe Bryant
 Cristiano Ronaldo
 Homer Simpson
 Gael García Bernal
 André Ooijer

References

External links
Advert on YouTube
Independent Films production company

2010 FIFA World Cup
2010 works
Nike Inc. advertising
American television commercials
2010s television commercials
Winners of the Cannes Lions International Advertising Festival Film Grand Prix
Wieden+Kennedy
Advertising campaigns